Marius Ioan Mârne (born 8 February 1977 in Arad) is a Romanian former football player.

External links
 
 

1977 births
Living people
Romanian footballers
Association football goalkeepers
Liga I players
FC UTA Arad players
FC Universitatea Cluj players
FC Bihor Oradea players
Sportspeople from Arad, Romania